"Games That Lovers Play" is a popular song composed by James Last which became a hit for multiple artists in 1966 and 1967. The song has been recorded more than 100 times.

Renditions by Eddie Fisher, Wayne Newton, and Mantovani charted concurrently late in 1966 in the U.S., with Fisher's doing best, reaching number 45 on the U.S. Billboard Hot 100. His and Newton's versions also charted on the Easy Listening chart, with Fisher's rendition reaching number two. His record also became a moderate hit in Canada.  It was arranged by Nelson Riddle.

In early 1967, "Games That Lovers Play" became a hit for Donald Peers in the United Kingdom and for Connie Francis in South Africa, where it reached the Top 20. Her B-side, "Spanish Nights and You," became a pop (#99) and Easy Listening (#15) hit in the United States.

Chart history
Eddie Fisher

Wayne Newton

Mantovani and His Orchestra

Donald Peers

Connie Francis

References

External links
  (Eddie Fisher)
  (Wayne Newton)

1966 songs
1966 singles
1967 singles
Eddie Fisher (singer) songs
Wayne Newton songs
Connie Francis songs
Songs with music by James Last
RCA Records singles
MGM Records singles
Songs written by Eddie Snyder
Songs with lyrics by Larry Kusik